Shahapur is a city and taluka headquarter located in the Yadgir district of Indian state of Karnataka. Shahapur is 597 km north of Bangalore and well connected by road to Gulbarga (70 km), Hyderabad (240 km), Bidar (160 km), Raichur (90 km) and Yadgir (32 km).

Geography
It has an average elevation of 428 metres (1404 feet).

Demographics
As per the 2011 Indian census, Shahapur had a population of 57,129. Males constitute 52% of the population and females 48%. Shahapur has an average literacy rate of 52%, lower than the national average of 65.38% and also lower than the state literacy which is 67%: shahapur male literacy is 61%, and female literacy is 43%. In Shahapur, 16% of the population is under 6 years of age. Shahapur is a Muslim-majority city in Karnataka with 20% Hindus.

About
The Town Municipal Council (TMC) Shahapur was constituted in 1954 and this TMC is upgraded  (in 2015) as a (CMC)  (City Municipal Council). The CMC has 32 wards and an equal number of councillors. Shahapura CMC stretches to an area of  13.65 km2.  Summer Temperature as high as 45 -43 degree Celsius and  Winter Temp-27 degree Celsius

Name
As per the mythology, the old name of Shahapur was "Sagar". In support of this name there is historical evidence such as the sobriquet of the Vijayanagara Kingdom's last ruler Ramaraya (son-in-law of Srikrishna Devaraya), who was also called "Sagara Sankramanaraya". After the Muslim attack, the name of the city was changed to Nusratabad. As per historians after the attack "Sagar "village is shifted to the other side of the hill line and the original Sagar has been abandoned for some time and was called "Halu Sagar". As time passes and now it is called as "Hali Sagar" means Old Sagar. The area between Krishna and Bhima rivers is called "Sagara Nadu". It consists of Shahapur, Surpur (Shorapur) and Jewargi talukas.

Taluk
The Shahpur Taluka contains thirty-seven panchayat villages:

Climate

Tourism attractions

 Sleeping Buddha Hill, made up of four hills.

References

Tadabidi

External links
 https://web.archive.org/web/20090827043023/http://shahapuratown.gov.in/
 
 http://www.bhorukapower.com/shahapur.htm
 

Cities and towns in Yadgir district                 
Taluks in Yadgiri district